These are the results of the women's balance beam competition, one of six events for female competitors in artistic gymnastics at the 1968 Summer Olympics in Mexico City.

Kuchinskaya was controversially awarded gold over Čáslavská after initial scores were revised. A similar controversy occurred in the floor event, and both were in favor of Soviet athletes.

Competition format

Each nation entered a team of six gymnasts or up to three individual gymnasts. All entrants in the gymnastics competitions performed both a compulsory exercise and a voluntary exercise for each apparatus. The scores for all 8 exercises were summed to give an individual all-around score.

These exercise scores were also used for qualification for the new apparatus finals. The two exercises (compulsory and voluntary) for each apparatus were summed to give an apparatus score; the top 6 in each apparatus participated in the finals; others were ranked 7th through 101st. In the final, each gymnast performed an additional voluntary exercise; half of the score from the preliminary carried over.

Results

References

Official Olympic Report
www.gymnasticsresults.com
www.gymn-forum.net

Women's balance beam
1968 in women's gymnastics
Women's events at the 1968 Summer Olympics